The Huzoor Palace, currently the residence of the royal family, is located in Gondal, India. Its annex, or wing, is known as the Orchard Palace.

As it is located next to an orchard of fruit trees, in a well tended garden, it is called the Orchard Palace. It has many garages known as "the Royal Garages" which display a plethora of cars mostly of 1950s vintage still in well preserved and in working condition. This collection of vintage cars is stated to be "the greatest collection of vintage cars in the whole of Asia". Also exhibited in the garages are a large collection of horse-drawn coaches both Victorian and Shetland type. The rooms here have high ceilings and the bed room furnishings include four posters, apart from the royal artifact collection of over 100 years.

References

Bibliography

Palaces in Gujarat
Tourist attractions in Rajkot district
Rajput architecture
Royal residences in India